Methyl red (2-(N,N-dimethyl-4-aminophenyl) azobenzenecarboxylic acid), also called C.I. Acid Red 2, is an indicator dye that turns red in acidic solutions. It is an azo dye, and is a dark red crystalline powder. Methyl red is a pH indicator; it is red in pH under 4.4, yellow in pH over 6.2, and orange in between, with a pKa of 5.1. Murexide and methyl red are investigated as promising enhancers of sonochemical destruction of chlorinated hydrocarbon pollutants. Methyl red is classed by the IARC in group 3 - unclassified as to carcinogenic potential in humans.

Preparation
As an azo dye, methyl red may be prepared by diazotization of anthranilic acid, followed by reaction with dimethylaniline:

Properties
Methyl red displays pH dependent photochromism, with protonation causing it to adopt a hydrazone/quinone structure.

Methyl Red has a special use in histopathology for showing acidic nature of tissue and presence of organisms with acidic natured cell walls.

Methyl Red is detectably fluorescent in 1:1 water:methanol (pH 7.0), with an emission maximum at 375 nm (UVA) upon excitation with 310 nm light (UVB).

Methyl red test

In microbiology, methyl red is used in the methyl red test (MR test), used to identify bacteria producing stable acids by mechanisms of mixed acid fermentation of glucose (cf. Voges–Proskauer test).

The MR test, the "M" portion of the four IMViC tests, is used to identify enteric bacteria based on their pattern of glucose metabolism. All enterics initially produce pyruvic acid from glucose metabolism. Some enterics subsequently use the mixed acid pathway to metabolize pyruvic acid to other acids, such as lactic, acetic, and formic acids. These bacteria are called methyl-red positive and include Escherichia coli and Proteus vulgaris. Other enterics subsequently use the butylene glycol pathway to metabolize pyruvic acid to neutral end products. These bacteria are called methyl-red-negative and include Serratia marcescens and Enterobacter aerogenes.

Process
A tube filled with a glucose phosphate broth is inoculated with a sterile transfer loop. After incubation, 2.5 ml of the medium are transferred to another tube. Five drops of the pH indicator methyl red is added to this tube. The tube is gently rolled between the palms to disperse the methyl red.

Expected results
Enterics that subsequently metabolize pyruvic acid to other acids lower the pH of the medium to 4.2. At this pH, methyl red turns red, a positive test. Enterics that subsequently metabolize pyruvic acid to neutral end products lower the pH of the medium to only 6.0. At this pH, methyl red is yellow, a negative test.

See also
Methyl
Universal Indicator
Tashiro's indicator
pH indicators
Methyl yellow
Methyl orange
Methyl violet

References

"Microbiology, A Photographic Atlas for the Laboratory", Alexander, Street, Pearson Education, 2001.

External links 

 Nile Chemicals -- Methyl Red A site showing some extra information on methyl red.
 Synthesis of methyl red

IARC Group 3 carcinogens
PH indicators
Azo dyes
Anthranilic acids
Dimethylamino compounds